The Atlas Moth is an American post-metal band from Chicago, Illinois, that formed in 2007.

Background
The band made its full-length debut on Candlelight in 2009 with A Glorified Piece of Blue-Sky, following up in 2011 with An Ache for the Distance, which was released on Profound Lore. The Atlas Moth blend of musical styles has been described by Pitchfork as "militantly adventurous heavy metal".

Discography

Singles
 Hope for Atlantis (2008, Witch Trial Records)

EPs
 Pray for Tides (2008, self-released)
 The One Amongst the Weed Fields (2010, Candlelight Records)

Studio albums
 A Glorified Piece of Blue-Sky (2009, Candlelight Records)
 An Ache for the Distance (2011, Profound Lore Records)
 The Old Believer (2014, Profound Lore Records)
 Coma Noir (2018, Prosthetic Records)

Splits
 Label Showcase - Profound Lore Records (2012, Profound Lore Records)
 The Atlas Moth / Wolvhammer (2013, Init Records)

References 

Musical groups established in 2007
American post-metal musical groups
Heavy metal musical groups from Illinois
Musical groups from Chicago
American stoner rock musical groups
Profound Lore Records artists
Candlelight Records artists